Mathieu Baumel (born 17 January 1976) is a French rally raid co-driver currently competing in the World Rally-Raid Championship. Alongside Nasser Al-Attiyah, he won the Dakar Rally four times and the FIA World Cup for Cross-Country Rallies four times. He also won the World Rally-Raid Championship with Nasser.

References

1976 births
Living people
People from Manosque
French rally co-drivers
Dakar Rally co-drivers
Sportspeople from Alpes-de-Haute-Provence